Terminalia leiocarpa is a species from the genus Terminalia. The tree is native to areas of tropical Africa from Senegal and Guinea in the west to Eritrea in the east and as far south as the Democratic Republic of the Congo.

References

leiocarpa
Plants described in 1876
Taxa named by Henri Ernest Baillon
Flora of Benin
Flora of Burkina Faso
Flora of Cameroon
Flora of the Central African Republic
Flora of Chad
Flora of Eritrea
Flora of Ethiopia
Flora of the Gambia
Flora of Ghana
Flora of Guinea
Flora of Ivory Coast
Flora of Mali
Flora of Mauritania
Flora of Niger
Flora of Nigeria
Flora of Senegal
Flora of Sudan
Flora of Togo
Flora of the Democratic Republic of the Congo